The slender blenny (Tanyemblemaria alleni) is a species of chaenopsid blenny found around Panama, known from one species collected at Isla del Rey. It can reach a length of  TL. The specific name honours the collector of the type, Gerald R. Allen of the Western Australia Museum in Perth.

References
 Hastings, P. A. 1992 Phylogenetic relationships of Tanyemblemaria alleni, a new genus and species of chaenopsid (Pisces: Blennioidei) from the Gulf of Panama. Bulletin of Marine Science v. 51 (no. 2): 147–160.

slender blenny
Fish of Panama
Gulf of Panama
slender blenny